Frode Flesjå (born 31 December 1973) is a Norwegian former professional racing cyclist. He won the Norwegian National Road Race Championship in 1996.

References

External links

1973 births
Living people
Norwegian male cyclists
Place of birth missing (living people)